Dishna (from ) is an Egyptian settlement west of Qena situated on the north bank of the river Nile.

Geography

History
An expedition of the Southern University of Texas explored the Sebilian culture on the Dishna plains. The Ain Khoman tools of Oasis Baharia were identified as similar to the Esnan industry of the Dishna dated to c.12,300 B.P, differing only with respect to bifacial tools. Several sites between Wadi Kubbaniya and the plains contained assemblages also of Esnan industrial production. The Esnan industry, also known as Mesnian, employed a non-levallois technique, productions composed largely of end-scrapers, though also including  a much smaller number of arch-backed bladelets and trapezoid.

See also

 List of cities and towns in Egypt
 Bodmer Papyri

References

External links 

 Fekri A. Hassan  1974  - The archaeology of the Dishna Plain, Egypt: a study of a late palaeolithic settlement, Issues 57-60  Ministry of petroleum and Mineral Wealth, Geological Survey of Egypt and Mining Authority - Social Science - 174 pages library of Yale University Retrieved 2011-10-16 - books.google Retrieved 2012-01-14

Populated places in Qena Governorate